Elmer Thomas Lake  is a lake in Comanche County in the state of Oklahoma in the United States. It is located on the boundary between the Wichita Mountain Wildlife Refuge and Fort Sill military base. The lake is named for an Oklahoma lawyer and politician, Elmer Thomas (1876–1965), who lived in Lawton and represented Oklahoma's 6th Congressional District in the U. S. House of Representatives from 1922 until 1926, then was elected as U.S. Senator, where he served until 1950.

The lake has a stream source from Little Medicine Creek, encompasses , and primarily serves as a recreation area.

Recreation
Lake Elmer Thomas Recreation Area (LETRA) which is on the Fort Sill military base, provides camping areas, cabins, a swim beach, water slides, picnic areas, boating ramps and boat rentals. On the refuge side of the lake, there are two fishing piers and a boating ramp.

See also
 Cache Creek
 Wichita Mountains
 Wichita Mountains Wildlife Refuge

References

External links
 
 Lake Elmer Thomas Recreation Area information, photos and videos on TravelOK.com 
 
 
 
 Oklahoma Digital Maps: Digital Collections of Oklahoma and Indian Territory

Elmer Thomas
Bodies of water of Comanche County, Oklahoma
Tourist attractions in Comanche County, Oklahoma